Carel de Iongh (6 October 1883 – 2 June 1964) was a Dutch sports shooter. He competed in two events at the 1924 Summer Olympics.

References

External links
 

1883 births
1964 deaths
Dutch male sport shooters
Olympic shooters of the Netherlands
Shooters at the 1924 Summer Olympics
Sportspeople from Dordrecht